This is a list of years in Scotland.

Earlier centuries
9th Century in Scotland
10th Century in Scotland
11th Century in Scotland
12th Century in Scotland

13th century

14th century

Decades

Years

15th century

Decades

Years

16th century

Decades

Years

17th century

Decades

Years

18th century

19th century

20th century

21st century

See also
List of years in the United Kingdom
List of years in England
List of years in Northern Ireland
List of years in Wales
History of Scotland
History of the United Kingdom

References

Years in Scotland
Centuries in Scotland